Mount McCrory is a mountain  east-southeast of Mount Vance in the eastern part of the Ickes Mountains, Marie Byrd Land, Antarctica. It was mapped by the United States Geological Survey from surveys and U.S. Navy air photos, 1959–65, and was named by the Advisory Committee on Antarctic Names for Captain Eugene E. McCrory, United States Coast Guard, Commanding Officer of  during Operation Deep Freeze 1969 and 1970.

References

Mountains of Marie Byrd Land